Hitradio Namibia is the first and only German language private radio station in Namibia. The station went on air on August 1, 2012. Owners were the German Namibians Wilfried Hähner and Sybille Rothkegel, and since October 2020 Sybille Moldzio, Björn Eichhoff and Kai-Uwe Schonecke.

The station was from 2012 to 2014 and is since February 2020 located at Maerua Mall in Windhoek. In between, Hitradio Namibia broadcast from its own broadcasting centre in Windhoek-Suiderhof.

Hitradio Namibia targets the German speaking audience in Namibia and abroad.

 Windhoek and surrounds: FM 99.5
 Central Coast (e.g. Swakopmund, Walvis Bay): 97.5
 Lüderitz: 97.5
 Otjiwarongo: 90.0
 Tsumeb: 90.4
 Oshakati and surrounds: 101.1 (since February 2018)

References

External links
 

Radio stations in Namibia
Radio stations established in 2012
2012 establishments in Namibia
German-Namibian culture
Mass media in Windhoek